Communist Party of India (Marxist–Leninist) Unity Initiative was a communist party in India. It was led by Viswam.

The CPI (ML) Unity Initiative joined the Six Party Forum, a joint body of Communist Revolutionary organisations formed in 1995.

In 2003, the party merged with the Communist Organisation of India (Marxist-Leninist) (led by Kanu Sanyal), forming a new Communist Party of India (Marxist-Leninist). The merger statement was signed between the two organisations on 17 January 2003.

References

Defunct communist parties in India
Political parties with year of establishment missing
Political parties disestablished in 2003
2003 disestablishments in India